Eiderkanal is an Amt ("collective municipality") in the district of Rendsburg-Eckernförde, in Schleswig-Holstein, Germany. It is situated on the Kiel Canal, approx. 2 km southeast of Rendsburg. The seat of the Amt is in Osterrönfeld. It is named after the old Eider Canal, whose western terminus was at Rendsburg.

Subdivision
The Amt consists of the following municipalities:

Bovenau 
Haßmoor 
Ostenfeld
Osterrönfeld
Rade bei Rendsburg 
Schacht-Audorf 
Schülldorf

See also
Eider Canal
Amt Osterrönfeld

References 

Ämter in Schleswig-Holstein